
The following is a list of Playboy Playmates of 1976.  Playboy magazine names its Playmate of the Month each month throughout the year.

January

Daina House (born December 30, 1954 in Dallas, Texas) is a former model and actress. She was Playboy magazine's Playmate of the Month for its January 1976 issue. Her centerfold was photographed by Ken Marcus.

February

Laura Lyons (born October 22, 1954) is an American model.  She was Playboy magazine's Playmate of the Month for its February 1976 issue. Her centerfold was photographed by Dwight Hooker and Mario Casilli.  She worked as a Playboy Bunny in the Chicago Playboy Club prior to becoming a Playmate, and led a protest and brief strike gaining improved work privileges such as the freedom to date customers.

March

Ann Victoria Pennington (born June 3, 1950 in Seattle, Washington) is an American model and actress. She was Playboy magazine's Playmate of the Month for its March 1976 issue. Her centerfold was photographed by Pompeo Posar and Phillip Dixon.
She is the sister of Janice Pennington, and like Janice, appeared as a model on game shows.

Pennington was married to Shaun Cassidy.

April

Denise Michele (born June 12, 1953 in San Francisco, California) is a former model who was Playboy magazine's Playmate of the Month for April 1976. Her Playboy pictorial was shot by Ken Marcus. She is also featured in a number of Playboy videos. She appears on the album cover of Robert Palmer's Some People Can Do What They Like (1976) and had some minor movie and TV roles.

May

Patricia Margot McClain (born May 3, 1954 in Long Beach, California) is an American model.  She was Playboy magazine's Playmate of the Month for its May 1976 issue. Her centerfold was photographed by Ken Marcus.

In 1996, McClain's firing from her office manager job over her Playmate past made national news. Her lawsuit was settled for an undisclosed sum. After the firing, she worked for Playboy in their editing department. In 1999, she attempted to challenge Elton Gallegly for the Republican Congressional nomination in his Ventura County district.

June

Debra Peterson (born April 15, 1955 in Santa Monica, California) is an American model. She was Playboy magazine's Playmate of the Month for its June 1976 issue. Her centerfold was photographed by Pompeo Posar.

July

Deborah Borkman (born January 8, 1957 in Virginia) is an American model of Swedish and Japanese descent. She was Playboy magazine's Playmate of the Month for its July 1976 issue. Her centerfold was photographed by Phillip Dixon.

August

Linda Beatty (born September 16, 1952 in Louisville, Kentucky) is a model and actress. She was Playboy magazine's Playmate of the Month for the August 1976 issue. Her centerfold was photographed by Phillip Dixon and Ken Marcus. Her most prominent movie role was that of a Playmate doing a USO tour in the Vietnam War epic Apocalypse Now.

September

Whitney Kaine (born September 20, 1956 in Ogden, Utah) is an American model. She was Playboy magazine's Playmate of the Month for its September 1976 issue. Her centerfold was photographed by Grant Edwards and Phillip Dixon.

October

Hope Olson (born April 4, 1956 in Prairie du Chien, Wisconsin) is an American model. She was Playboy magazine's Playmate of the Month for its October 1976 issue. Her centerfold was photographed by Ken Marcus.

November

Patti McGuire (born September 5, 1951 in Dexter, Missouri) is an American model and television producer. She was Playboy magazine's Playmate of the Month for the November 1976 issue, and the 1977 Playmate of the Year. Her original pictorial was photographed by Pompeo Posar. She married tennis star Jimmy Connors in 1979; they have two children.

December

Karen Hafter (born December 27, 1954 in New York City) is an American model. She was Playboy magazine's Playmate of the Month for its December 1976 issue. Her centerfold was photographed by Phillip Dixon.

See also
 List of people in Playboy 1970–1979

References

1976-related lists
1976
Playmates Of 1976